The sandperches are a family, Pinguipedidae, of fishes in the percomorph order Trachiniformes. Sandperches are benthic fish which normally occur over sand or rubble substrates in shallow seas. They are found off the coasts of South America, South Africa and in the Indo-Pacific as far east as Japan. The family contains a few species which are used by humans for food.

Characteristics
Some sandperches resemble wrasse in that they possess long dorsal and anal fins  which may have a few spines and enlarged lips that appear to curl back with big canine teeth in the front of the jaws. They have elongated bodies which are flattened posteriorly and cylindrical towards the head. The body usually patterned with spots and bands, The eyes are positioned near top of head. They are relatively small in size, normally  in length. These fish tend to sit on the sea bed, their bodies propped up by the widely separated pelvic fins. Some of the members of the speciose genus Parapercis, maybe all of them, are sequential hermaphrodites, all being female at sexual maturity and later changing into males which frequently have significantly different colourings and markings.

Genera
The family Pinguipedidae contains seven genera with a total of 65 species. The genera are:
 Kochichthys Kamohara, 1961
 Parapercis Bleeker, 1863
 Pinguipes Cuvier in Cuvier and Valenciennes, 1829
 Prolatilus Gill, 1865
 Pseudopercis Miranda Ribeiro, 1903
 Ryukyupercis Imamura & Yoshino, 2007.
 Simipercis Johnson & Randall 2006.

Timeline

References
 
 

Trachiniformes
Taxa named by Albert Günther